Vladimir Panteleyevich Kulakov (12 October 1936 – 24 October 2022) was a Soviet-Belarusian politician.

Kulakov died on 24 October 2022, at the age of 86.

References

1936 births
2022 deaths
Communist Party of the Soviet Union members
Members of the Supreme Soviet of the Byelorussian SSR (1985–1990)
Communist Party of Byelorussia politicians
Belarus State Economic University alumni
Recipients of the Order of Lenin
Recipients of the Order of the Red Banner of Labour
People from Tver Oblast